John Heaviside (born 7 October 1943) is an English former amateur footballer who played in the Football League as a left back for Darlington. He also played non-league football for Bishops Middleham and Spennymoor United.

References

1943 births
Living people
People from Ferryhill
Footballers from County Durham
English footballers
Association football fullbacks
Darlington F.C. players
Spennymoor United F.C. players
English Football League players